The Cuban Missile Crisis, also known as the October Crisis (of 1962) in Cuba, the Caribbean Crisis in Russia, or the Missile Scare, was a 35-day (October 16 – November 20, 1962) confrontation between the United States and the Soviet Union, which escalated into an international crisis when American deployments of missiles in Italy and Turkey were matched by Soviet deployments of similar ballistic missiles in Cuba. Despite the short time frame, the Cuban Missile Crisis remains a defining moment in national security and nuclear war preparation. The confrontation is often considered the closest the Cold War came to escalating into a full-scale nuclear war.

In 1961 the US government put Jupiter nuclear missiles in Italy and Turkey, and attempted to invade Cuba. Starting in November of that year the US government engaged in a campaign of terrorism and sabotage in Cuba, referred to as the Cuban Project, which continued throughout the first half of the 1960s. The Soviet administration was concerned about a Cuban drift towards China, with which the Soviets had an increasingly fractious relationship. In response to these factors, Soviet First Secretary, Nikita Khrushchev, agreed with the Cuban Prime Minister, Fidel Castro, to place nuclear missiles on the island of Cuba to deter a future invasion. An agreement was reached during a secret meeting between Khrushchev and Castro in July 1962, and construction of a number of missile launch facilities started later that summer.

Meanwhile, campaigning for the 1962 United States elections was underway, and the White House denied charges for months that it was ignoring dangerous Soviet missiles  from Florida. The missile preparations were confirmed when a US Air Force U-2 spy plane produced clear photographic evidence of medium-range R-12 (NATO code name SS-4) and intermediate-range R-14 (NATO code name SS-5) ballistic missile facilities.

When this was reported to President John F. Kennedy, he then convened a meeting of the nine members of the National Security Council and five other key advisers, in a group that became known as the Executive Committee of the National Security Council (EXCOMM). During this meeting, President Kennedy was originally advised to carry out an air strike on Cuban soil in order to compromise Soviet missile supplies, followed by an invasion of the Cuban mainland. After careful consideration, President Kennedy chose a less aggressive course of action, in order to avoid a declaration of war. After consultation with EXCOMM, Kennedy ordered a naval "quarantine" on October 22 to prevent further missiles from reaching Cuba. By using the term "quarantine", rather than "blockade" (an act of war by legal definition), the United States was able to avoid the implications of a state of war. The US announced it would not permit offensive weapons to be delivered to Cuba and demanded that the weapons already in Cuba be dismantled and returned to the Soviet Union.

After several days of tense negotiations, an agreement was reached between Kennedy and Khrushchev: publicly, the Soviets would dismantle their offensive weapons in Cuba and return them to the Soviet Union, subject to United Nations verification, in exchange for a US public declaration and agreement to not invade Cuba again. Secretly, the United States agreed with the Soviets that it would dismantle all of the Jupiter MRBMs which had been deployed to Turkey against the Soviet Union. There has been debate on whether or not Italy was included in the agreement as well. While the Soviets dismantled their missiles, some Soviet bombers remained in Cuba, and the United States kept the naval quarantine in place until November 20, 1962.

When all offensive missiles and the Ilyushin Il-28 light bombers had been withdrawn from Cuba, the blockade was formally ended on November 20. The negotiations between the United States and the Soviet Union pointed out the necessity of a quick, clear, and direct communication line between the two superpowers. As a result, the Moscow–Washington hotline was established. A series of agreements later reduced US–Soviet tensions for several years, until both parties eventually resumed expanding their nuclear arsenals.

Background

Cuba–Soviet relations

In late 1961, Fidel Castro asked for more SA-2 anti-aircraft missiles from the Soviet Union. The request was not acted upon by the Soviet leadership. In the interval Fidel Castro began criticizing the Soviets for lack of "revolutionary boldness", and began talking to China about agreements for economic assistance. In March 1962, Fidel Castro ordered the ousting of Anibal Escalante and his pro-Moscow comrades from Cuba's Integrated Revolutionary Organizations. This affair alarmed the Soviet leadership as well as fears of a possible US invasion. In this crisis of international relations the Soviet Union sent more SA-2 anti-aircraft missiles in April as well as a regiment of regular Soviet troops.

Timothy Naftali has contended that Escalante's dismissal was a motivating factor behind the Soviet decision to place nuclear missiles in Cuba in 1962. According to Naftali, Soviet foreign policy planners were concerned Castro's break with Escalante foreshadowed a Cuban drift toward China and sought to solidify the Soviet-Cuban relationship through the missile basing program.

Cuba–US relations

With the end of World War II and the start of the Cold War, the United States government sought to promote private enterprise as an instrument for advancing US strategic interests in the developing world. It had grown concerned about the expansion of communism.

Starting in 1959, under the Eisenhower administration, the US government had the Central Intelligence Agency recruit operatives in Cuba to carry out terrorism and sabotage, kill civilians, and cause economic damage. The John F. Kennedy administration was publicly embarrassed by the failed Bay of Pigs Invasion in April 1961. It had been launched at the initiative of Richard M. Bissell Jr. and approved by Kennedy, and used CIA-trained forces of Cuban exiles. Afterward, former President Eisenhower told Kennedy that "the failure of the Bay of Pigs will embolden the Soviets to do something that they would otherwise not do." The half-hearted invasion left Soviet first secretary Nikita Khrushchev and his advisers with the impression that Kennedy was indecisive and, as one Soviet adviser wrote, "too young, intellectual, not prepared well for decision making in crisis situations... too intelligent and too weak".

Following the failed invasion, the US massively escalated its sponsorship of terrorism against the island. In late 1961, using the military and the Central Intelligence Agency, the US government engaged in an extensive campaign of state-sponsored terrorism against civilian and military targets in Cuba. The terrorist attacks killed significant numbers of civilians. The US armed, trained, funded and directed the terrorists, most of whom were Cuban expatriates. Terrorist attacks were planned at the direction and with the participation of US government employees and launched from US territory. In January 1962, US Air Force General Edward Lansdale described the plans to overthrow the Cuban government in a top-secret report, addressed to Kennedy and officials involved with Operation Mongoose. CIA agents or "pathfinders" from the Special Activities Division were to be infiltrated into Cuba to carry out sabotage and organization, including radio broadcasts. In February 1962, the US launched an embargo against Cuba, and Lansdale presented a 26-page, top-secret timetable for implementation of the overthrow of the Cuban government, mandating guerrilla operations to begin in August and September. "Open revolt and overthrow of the Communist regime" was hoped by the planners to occur in the first two weeks of October.

The terrorism campaign and the threat of invasion were crucial factors in the Cuban government's decision to accept the placement of Soviet nuclear missiles on Cuban territory. The US government was aware at the time, as reported to the president in a National Intelligence Estimate, that the invasion threat was a key reason for Cuban acceptance of the missiles.

Soviet–US relations

When Kennedy ran for president in 1960, one of his key election issues was an alleged "missile gap" with the Soviets. In fact, the US at that time led the Soviets by a wide margin, which would only increase over time. In 1961, the Soviets had only four R-7 Semyorka intercontinental ballistic missiles (ICBMs). By October 1962, they may have had dozens, with some intelligence estimates as high as 75.

The US, on the other hand, had 170 ICBMs and was quickly building more. Khrushchev increased the perception of a missile gap when he loudly boasted to the world that the Soviets were building missiles "like sausages" but Soviet missiles' numbers and capabilities were nowhere close to his assertions. The Soviet Union had medium-range ballistic missiles in quantity, about 700 of them, but they were unreliable and inaccurate. The US had a considerable advantage in its total number of nuclear warheads (27,000 against 3,600) and in the technology required for their accurate delivery. The US also led in missile defensive capabilities, naval and air power; however, the Soviets held a two-to-one advantage in conventional ground forces, more pronounced in field guns and tanks, particularly in the European theatre.

Khrushchev also had an impression of Kennedy as weak, which to him was confirmed by the President's response during the Berlin Crisis of 1961, particularly to the building of the Berlin Wall. Speaking to Soviet officials in the aftermath of the crisis, Khrushchev asserted, "I know for certain that Kennedy doesn't have a strong background, nor, generally speaking, does he have the courage to stand up to a serious challenge." He also told his son Sergei that on Cuba, Kennedy "would make a fuss, make more of a fuss, and then agree".

Prelude

Conception 
In May 1962, Soviet First Secretary Nikita Khrushchev was persuaded by the idea of countering the US's growing lead in developing and deploying strategic missiles by placing Soviet intermediate-range nuclear missiles in Cuba, despite the misgivings of the Soviet Ambassador in Havana, Alexandr Ivanovich Alexeyev, who argued that Castro would not accept the deployment of the missiles. Khrushchev faced a strategic situation in which the US was perceived to have a "splendid first strike" capability that put the Soviet Union at a huge disadvantage. In 1962, the Soviets had only 20 ICBMs capable of delivering nuclear warheads to the US from inside the Soviet Union. The poor accuracy and reliability of the missiles raised serious doubts about their effectiveness. A newer, more reliable generation of ICBMs would become operational only after 1965.

Therefore, Soviet nuclear capability in 1962 placed less emphasis on ICBMs than on medium and intermediate-range ballistic missiles (MRBMs and IRBMs). The missiles could hit American allies and most of Alaska from Soviet territory but not the contiguous United States. Graham Allison, the director of Harvard University's Belfer Center for Science and International Affairs, points out, "The Soviet Union could not right the nuclear imbalance by deploying new ICBMs on its own soil. In order to meet the threat it faced in 1962, 1963, and 1964, it had very few options. Moving existing nuclear weapons to locations from which they could reach American targets was one."

A second reason that Soviet missiles were deployed to Cuba was because Khrushchev wanted to bring West Berlin, controlled by the American, British and French within Communist East Germany, into the Soviet orbit. The East Germans and Soviets considered western control over a portion of Berlin a grave threat to East Germany. Khrushchev made West Berlin the central battlefield of the Cold War. Khrushchev believed that if the US did nothing over the missile deployments in Cuba, he could muscle the West out of Berlin using said missiles as a deterrent to western countermeasures in Berlin. If the US tried to bargain with the Soviets after it became aware of the missiles, Khrushchev could demand trading the missiles for West Berlin. Since Berlin was strategically more important than Cuba, the trade would be a win for Khrushchev, as Kennedy recognized: "The advantage is, from Khrushchev's point of view, he takes a great chance but there are quite some rewards to it."

Thirdly, from the perspective of the Soviet Union and of Cuba, it seemed that the United States wanted to increase its presence in Cuba. With actions including the attempt to expel Cuba from the Organization of American States, placing economic sanctions on the nation, directly invading it in addition to conducting secret operations on containing communism and Cuba, it was assumed that America was trying to overrun Cuba. As a result, to try and prevent this, the USSR would place missiles in Cuba and neutralise the threat. This would ultimately serve to secure Cuba against attack and keep the country in the Socialist Bloc.

Another major reason why Khrushchev planned to place missiles on Cuba undetected was to "level the playing field" with the evident American nuclear threat. America had the upper hand as they could launch from Turkey and destroy the USSR before they would have a chance to react. After the emplacement of nuclear missiles in Cuba, Khrushchev had finally established mutual assured destruction, meaning that if the United States decided to launch a nuclear strike against the Soviet Union, the latter would react by launching a retaliatory nuclear strike against the US.

Finally, placing nuclear missiles on Cuba was a way for the USSR to show their support for Cuba and support the Cuban people who viewed the United States as a threatening force, as the latter had become their ally after the Cuban Revolution of 1959. According to Khrushchev, the Soviet Union's motives were "aimed at allowing Cuba to live peacefully and develop as its people desire".

Schlesinger, a historian and adviser to Kennedy, told National Public Radio in an interview on October 16, 2002, that Castro did not want the missiles, but Khrushchev pressured Castro to accept them. Castro was not completely happy with the idea, but the Cuban National Directorate of the Revolution accepted them, both to protect Cuba against US attack and to aid the Soviet Union.

Soviet military deployments 

In early 1962, a group of Soviet military and missile construction specialists accompanied an agricultural delegation to Havana. They obtained a meeting with Cuban prime minister Fidel Castro. The Cuban leadership had a strong expectation that the US would invade Cuba again and enthusiastically approved the idea of installing nuclear missiles in Cuba. According to another source, Castro objected to the missiles' deployment as making him look like a Soviet puppet, but he was persuaded that missiles in Cuba would be an irritant to the US and help the interests of the entire socialist camp. Also, the deployment would include short-range tactical weapons (with a range of 40 km, usable only against naval vessels) that would provide a "nuclear umbrella" for attacks upon the island.

By May, Khrushchev and Castro agreed to place strategic nuclear missiles secretly in Cuba. Like Castro, Khrushchev felt that a US invasion of Cuba was imminent and that to lose Cuba would do great harm to the communists, especially in Latin America. He said he wanted to confront the Americans "with more than words.... the logical answer was missiles". The Soviets maintained their tight secrecy, writing their plans longhand, which were approved by Marshal of the Soviet Union Rodion Malinovsky on July 4 and Khrushchev on July 7.

From the very beginning, the Soviets' operation entailed elaborate denial and deception, known as "maskirovka". All the planning and preparation for transporting and deploying the missiles were carried out in the utmost secrecy, with only a very few told the exact nature of the mission. Even the troops detailed for the mission were given misdirection by being told that they were headed for a cold region and being outfitted with ski boots, fleece-lined parkas, and other winter equipment. The Soviet code-name was Operation Anadyr. The Anadyr River flows into the Bering Sea, and Anadyr is also the capital of Chukotsky District and a bomber base in the far eastern region. All the measures were meant to conceal the program from both internal and external audiences.

Specialists in missile construction under the guise of "machine operators", "irrigation specialists", and "agricultural specialists" arrived in July. A total of 43,000 foreign troops would ultimately be brought in. Chief Marshal of Artillery Sergei Biryuzov, Head of the Soviet Rocket Forces, led a survey team that visited Cuba. He told Khrushchev that the missiles would be concealed and camouflaged by palm trees.

As early as August 1962, the US suspected the Soviets of building missile facilities in Cuba. During that month, its intelligence services gathered information about sightings by ground observers of Soviet-built MiG-21 fighters and Il-28 light bombers. U-2 spy planes found S-75 Dvina (NATO designation SA-2) surface-to-air missile sites at eight different locations. CIA director John A. McCone was suspicious. Sending antiaircraft missiles into Cuba, he reasoned, "made sense only if Moscow intended to use them to shield a base for ballistic missiles aimed at the United States". On August 10, he wrote a memo to Kennedy in which he guessed that the Soviets were preparing to introduce ballistic missiles into Cuba. Che Guevara himself traveled to the Soviet Union on August 30, 1962 to sign off on the final agreement regarding the deployment of missiles in Cuba. The visit was heavily monitored by the CIA as Guevara had gained more scruitiny by American intelligence. While in the Soviet Union Guevara argued with Khrushchev that the missile deal should be made public but Khrushchev insisted on total secrecy, and swore the Soviet Union's support if the Americans discovered the missiles. By the time Guevara arrived in Cuba the United States had already discovered the Soviet troops in Cuba via U-2 spy planes.

With important Congressional elections scheduled for November, the crisis became enmeshed in American politics. On August 31, Senator Kenneth Keating (R-New York) warned on the Senate floor that the Soviet Union was "in all probability" constructing a missile base in Cuba. He charged the Kennedy administration with covering up a major threat to the US, thereby starting the crisis. He may have received this initial "remarkably accurate" information from his friend, former congresswoman and ambassador Clare Boothe Luce, who in turn received it from Cuban exiles. A later confirming source for Keating's information possibly was the West German ambassador to Cuba, who had received information from dissidents inside Cuba that Soviet troops had arrived in Cuba in early August and were seen working "in all probability on or near a missile base" and who passed this information to Keating on a trip to Washington in early October. Air Force General Curtis LeMay presented a pre-invasion bombing plan to Kennedy in September, and spy flights and minor military harassment from US forces at Guantanamo Bay Naval Base were the subject of continual Cuban diplomatic complaints to the US government.

The first consignment of Soviet R-12 missiles arrived on the night of September 8, followed by a second on September 16. The R-12 was a medium-range ballistic missile, capable of carrying a thermonuclear warhead. It was a single-stage, road-transportable, surface-launched, storable liquid propellant fuelled missile that could deliver a megaton-class nuclear weapon.

On October 7, Cuban President Osvaldo Dorticós Torrado spoke at the UN General Assembly: "If... we are attacked, we will defend ourselves. I repeat, we have sufficient means with which to defend ourselves; we have indeed our inevitable weapons, the weapons, which we would have preferred not to acquire, and which we do not wish to employ." On October 10 in another Senate speech Sen. Keating reaffirmed his earlier warning of August 31 and stated that, "Construction has begun on at least a half dozen launching sites for intermediate range tactical missiles."

The Cuban leadership was further upset when on September 20, the US Senate approved Joint Resolution 230, which expressed the US was determined "to prevent in Cuba the creation or use of an externally-supported military capability endangering the security of the United States". On the same day, the US announced a major military exercise in the Caribbean, PHIBRIGLEX-62, which Cuba denounced as a deliberate provocation and proof that the US planned to invade Cuba.

On September 11, the Soviet Union publicly warned that a US attack on Cuba or on Soviet ships that were carrying supplies to the island would mean war. The Soviets continued the Maskirovka program to conceal their actions in Cuba. They repeatedly denied that the weapons being brought into Cuba were offensive in nature. On September 7, Soviet Ambassador to the United States Anatoly Dobrynin assured United States Ambassador to the United Nations Adlai Stevenson that the Soviet Union was supplying only defensive weapons to Cuba. On September 11, the Telegraph Agency of the Soviet Union (TASS: Telegrafnoe Agentstvo Sovetskogo Soyuza) announced that the Soviet Union had no need or intention to introduce offensive nuclear missiles into Cuba. On October 13, Dobrynin was questioned by former Undersecretary of State Chester Bowles about whether the Soviets planned to put offensive weapons in Cuba. He denied any such plans. On October 17, Soviet embassy official Georgy Bolshakov brought President Kennedy a personal message from Khrushchev reassuring him that "under no circumstances would surface-to-surface missiles be sent to Cuba."

Missiles reported
The missiles in Cuba allowed the Soviets to effectively target most of the Continental US. The planned arsenal was forty launchers. The Cuban populace readily noticed the arrival and deployment of the missiles and hundreds of reports reached Miami. US intelligence received countless reports, many of dubious quality or even laughable, most of which could be dismissed as describing defensive missiles.

Only five reports bothered the analysts. They described large trucks passing through towns at night that were carrying very long canvas-covered cylindrical objects that could not make turns through towns without backing up and maneuvering. Defensive missile transporters, it was believed, could make such turns without undue difficulty. The reports could not be satisfactorily dismissed.

Aerial confirmation
The United States had been sending U-2 surveillance over Cuba since the failed Bay of Pigs Invasion. The first issue that led to a pause in reconnaissance flights took place on August 30, when a U-2 operated by the US Air Force's Strategic Air Command flew over Sakhalin Island in the Soviet Far East by mistake. The Soviets lodged a protest and the US apologized. Nine days later, a Taiwanese-operated U-2 was lost over western China to an SA-2 surface-to-air missile (SAM). US officials were worried that one of the Cuban or Soviet SAMs in Cuba might shoot down a CIA U-2, initiating another international incident. In a meeting with members of the Committee on Overhead Reconnaissance (COMOR) on September 10, Secretary of State Dean Rusk and National Security Advisor McGeorge Bundy heavily restricted further U-2 flights over Cuban airspace. The resulting lack of coverage over the island for the next five weeks became known to historians as the "Photo Gap". No significant U-2 coverage was achieved over the interior of the island. US officials attempted to use a Corona photo-reconnaissance satellite to obtain coverage over reported Soviet military deployments, but imagery acquired over western Cuba by a Corona KH-4 mission on October 1 was heavily covered by clouds and haze and failed to provide any usable intelligence. At the end of September, Navy reconnaissance aircraft photographed the Soviet ship Kasimov, with large crates on its deck the size and shape of Il-28 jet bomber fuselages.

In September 1962, analysts from the Defense Intelligence Agency (DIA) noticed that Cuban surface-to-air missile sites were arranged in a pattern similar to those used by the Soviet Union to protect its ICBM bases, leading DIA to lobby for the resumption of U-2 flights over the island. Although in the past the flights had been conducted by the CIA, pressure from the Defense Department led to that authority being transferred to the Air Force. Following the loss of a CIA U-2 over the Soviet Union in May 1960, it was thought that if another U-2 were shot down, an Air Force aircraft arguably being used for a legitimate military purpose would be easier to explain than a CIA flight.

When the reconnaissance missions were reauthorized on October 9, poor weather kept the planes from flying. The US first obtained U-2 photographic evidence of the missiles on October 14, when a U-2 flight piloted by Major Richard Heyser took 928 pictures on a path selected by DIA analysts, capturing images of what turned out to be an SS-4 construction site at San Cristóbal, Pinar del Río Province (now in Artemisa Province), in western Cuba.

President notified
On October 15, the CIA's National Photographic Interpretation Center (NPIC) reviewed the U-2 photographs and identified objects that they interpreted as medium range ballistic missiles. This identification was made, in part, on the strength of reporting provided by Oleg Penkovsky, a double agent in the GRU working for the CIA and MI6. Although he provided no direct reports of the Soviet missile deployments to Cuba, technical and doctrinal details of Soviet missile regiments that had been provided by Penkovsky in the months and years prior to the Crisis helped NPIC analysts correctly identify the missiles on U-2 imagery.

That evening, the CIA notified the Department of State and at 8:30 pm EDT, Bundy chose to wait until the next morning to tell the President. McNamara was briefed at midnight. The next morning, Bundy met with Kennedy and showed him the U-2 photographs and briefed him on the CIA's analysis of the images. At 6:30 pm EDT, Kennedy convened a meeting of the nine members of the National Security Council and five other key advisers, in a group he formally named the Executive Committee of the National Security Council (EXCOMM) after the fact on October 22 by National Security Action Memorandum 196. Without informing the members of EXCOMM, President Kennedy tape-recorded all of their proceedings, and Sheldon M. Stern, head of the Kennedy library transcribed some of them.

On October 16, President Kennedy notified Attorney General Robert Kennedy that he was convinced the Soviets were placing missiles in Cuba and it was a legitimate threat. This made the threat of nuclear destruction by two world superpowers a reality. Robert Kennedy responded by contacting the Soviet Ambassador, Anatoly Dobrynin. Robert Kennedy expressed his "concern about what was happening" and Dobrynin "was instructed by Soviet Chairman Nikita S. Khrushchev to assure President Kennedy that there would be no ground-to-ground missiles or offensive weapons placed in Cuba". Khrushchev further assured Kennedy that the Soviet Union had no intention of "disrupting the relationship of our two countries" despite the photo evidence presented before President Kennedy.

Responses considered

The US had no plan in place because until recently its intelligence had been convinced that the Soviets would never install nuclear missiles in Cuba. EXCOMM discussed several possible courses of action:

 Do nothing: American vulnerability to Soviet missiles was not new.
 Diplomacy: Use diplomatic pressure to get the Soviet Union to remove the missiles.
 Secret approach: Offer Castro the choice of splitting with the Soviets or being invaded.
 Invasion: Full-force invasion of Cuba and overthrow of Castro.
 Air strike: Use the US Air Force to attack all known missile sites.
 Blockade: Use the US Navy to block any missiles from arriving in Cuba.

The Joint Chiefs of Staff unanimously agreed that a full-scale attack and invasion was the only solution. They believed that the Soviets would not attempt to stop the US from conquering Cuba. Kennedy was skeptical:

Kennedy concluded that attacking Cuba by air would signal the Soviets to presume "a clear line" to conquer Berlin. Kennedy also believed that US allies would think of the country as "trigger-happy cowboys" who lost Berlin because they could not peacefully resolve the Cuban situation.

The EXCOMM then discussed the effect on the strategic balance of power, both political and military. The Joint Chiefs of Staff believed that the missiles would seriously alter the military balance, but McNamara disagreed. An extra 40, he reasoned, would make little difference to the overall strategic balance. The US already had approximately 5,000 strategic warheads, but the Soviet Union had only 300. McNamara concluded that the Soviets having 340 would not therefore substantially alter the strategic balance. In 1990, he reiterated that "it made no difference.... The military balance wasn't changed. I didn't believe it then, and I don't believe it now."

The EXCOMM agreed that the missiles would affect the political balance. Kennedy had explicitly promised the American people less than a month before the crisis that "if Cuba should possess a capacity to carry out offensive actions against the United States... the United States would act." Further, US credibility among its allies and people would be damaged if the Soviet Union appeared to redress the strategic imbalance by placing missiles in Cuba. Kennedy explained after the crisis that "it would have politically changed the balance of power. It would have appeared to, and appearances contribute to reality."

On October 18, Kennedy met with Soviet Minister of Foreign Affairs Andrei Gromyko, who claimed the weapons were for defensive purposes only. Not wanting to expose what he already knew and to avoid panicking the American public, Kennedy did not reveal that he was already aware of the missile buildup. By October 19, frequent U-2 spy flights showed four operational sites.

Operational plans
Two Operational Plans (OPLAN) were considered. OPLAN 316 envisioned a full invasion of Cuba by Army and Marine units, supported by the Navy, following Air Force and naval airstrikes. Army units in the US would have had trouble fielding mechanised and logistical assets, and the US Navy could not supply enough amphibious shipping to transport even a modest armoured contingent from the Army.

OPLAN 312, primarily an Air Force and Navy carrier operation, was designed with enough flexibility to do anything from engaging individual missile sites to providing air support for OPLAN 316's ground forces.

Blockade

Kennedy met with members of EXCOMM and other top advisers throughout October 21, considering two remaining options: an air strike primarily against the Cuban missile bases or a naval blockade of Cuba. A full-scale invasion was not the administration's first option. McNamara supported the naval blockade as a strong but limited military action that left the US in control. The term "blockade" was problematic – according to international law, a blockade is an act of war, but the Kennedy administration did not think that the Soviets would be provoked to attack by a mere blockade. Additionally, legal experts at the State Department and Justice Department concluded that a declaration of war could be avoided if another legal justification, based on the Rio Treaty for defence of the Western Hemisphere, was obtained from a resolution by a two-thirds vote from the members of the Organization of American States (OAS).

Admiral George Anderson, Chief of Naval Operations wrote a position paper that helped Kennedy to differentiate between what they termed a "quarantine" of offensive weapons and a blockade of all materials, claiming that a classic blockade was not the original intention. Since it would take place in international waters, Kennedy obtained the approval of the OAS for military action under the hemispheric defence provisions of the Rio Treaty:

On October 19, the EXCOMM formed separate working groups to examine the air strike and blockade options, and by the afternoon most support in the EXCOMM had shifted to a blockade. Reservations about the plan continued to be voiced as late as October 21, the paramount concern being that once the blockade was put into effect, the Soviets would rush to complete some of the missiles. Consequently, the US could find itself bombing operational missiles if the blockade did not force Khrushchev to remove the missiles already on the island.

Speech to the nation

At 3:00 pm EDT on October 22, President Kennedy formally established the executive committee (EXCOMM) with National Security Action Memorandum (NSAM) 196. At 5:00 pm, he met with Congressional leaders, who contentiously opposed a blockade and demanded a stronger response. In Moscow, US Ambassador Foy D. Kohler briefed Khrushchev on the pending blockade and Kennedy's speech to the nation. Ambassadors around the world gave notice to non-Eastern Bloc leaders. Before the speech, US delegations met with Canadian Prime Minister John Diefenbaker, British Prime Minister Harold Macmillan, West German Chancellor Konrad Adenauer, French President Charles de Gaulle and Secretary-General of the Organization of American States, José Antonio Mora to brief them on this intelligence and the US's proposed response. All were supportive of the US position. Over the course of the crisis, Kennedy had daily telephone conversations with Macmillan, who was publicly supportive of US actions.

Shortly before his speech, Kennedy telephoned former President Dwight Eisenhower. Kennedy's conversation with the former president also revealed that the two had been consulting during the Cuban Missile Crisis. The two also anticipated that Khrushchev would respond to the Western world in a manner similar to his response during the Suez Crisis, and would possibly wind up trading off Berlin.

At 7:00 pm EDT on October 22, Kennedy delivered a nationwide televised address on all of the major networks announcing the discovery of the missiles. He noted:

Kennedy described the administration's plan:

During the speech, a directive went out to all US forces worldwide, placing them on DEFCON 3. Kennedy's speech writer Ted Sorensen stated in 2007 that the address to the nation was "Kennedy's most important speech historically, in terms of its impact on our planet."

Crisis deepens

On October 24, at 11:24 am EDT, a cable, drafted by George Wildman Ball to the US Ambassador in Turkey and NATO, notified them that they were considering making an offer to withdraw the missiles from Italy and Turkey, in exchange for the Soviet withdrawal from Cuba. Turkish officials replied that they would "deeply resent" any trade involving the US missile presence in their country. One day later, on the morning of October 25, American journalist Walter Lippmann proposed the same thing in his syndicated column. Castro reaffirmed Cuba's right to self-defense and said that all of its weapons were defensive and Cuba would not allow an inspection.

International response
Three days after Kennedy's speech, the Chinese People's Daily announced that "650,000,000 Chinese men and women were standing by the Cuban people." In West Germany, newspapers supported the US response by contrasting it with the weak American actions in the region during the preceding months. They also expressed some fear that the Soviets might retaliate in Berlin. In France on October 23, the crisis made the front page of all the daily newspapers. The next day, an editorial in Le Monde expressed doubt about the authenticity of the CIA's photographic evidence. Two days later, after a visit by a high-ranking CIA agent, the newspaper accepted the validity of the photographs. In the October 29 issue of Le Figaro, Raymond Aron wrote in support of the American response. On October 24, Pope John XXIII sent a message to the Soviet embassy in Rome, to be transmitted to the Kremlin, in which he voiced his concern for peace. In this message he stated, "We beg all governments not to remain deaf to this cry of humanity. That they do all that is in their power to save peace."

Soviet broadcast and communications
The crisis continued unabated, and on the evening of October 24, the Soviet TASS news agency broadcast a telegram from Khrushchev to Kennedy, in which Khrushchev warned that the United States' "outright piracy" would lead to war. Khruschev then sent at 9:24 pm a telegram to Kennedy, which was received at 10:52 pm EDT. Khrushchev stated, "if you weigh the present situation with a cool head without giving way to passion, you will understand that the Soviet Union cannot afford not to decline the despotic demands of the USA" and that the Soviet Union viewed the blockade as "an act of aggression", and their ships would be instructed to ignore it. After October 23, Soviet communications with the USA increasingly showed indications of having been rushed. Undoubtedly a product of pressure, it was not uncommon for Khrushchev to repeat himself and to send messages lacking basic editing. With President Kennedy making his aggressive intentions of a possible airstrike followed by an invasion on Cuba known, Khrushchev rapidly sought a diplomatic compromise. Communications between the two superpowers had entered into a unique and revolutionary period; with the newly-developed threat of mutual destruction through the deployment of nuclear weapons, diplomacy now demonstrated how power and coercion could dominate negotiations.

US alert level raised

The US requested an emergency meeting of the United Nations Security Council on October 25. US Ambassador to the United Nations Adlai Stevenson confronted Soviet Ambassador Valerian Zorin in an emergency meeting of the Security Council, challenging him to admit the existence of the missiles. Ambassador Zorin refused to answer. At 10:00 pm EDT the next day, the US raised the readiness level of Strategic Air Command (SAC) forces to DEFCON 2. For the only confirmed time in US history, B-52 bombers went on continuous airborne alert, and B-47 medium bombers were dispersed to various military and civilian airfields and made ready to take off, fully equipped, on 15 minutes' notice. One-eighth of SAC's 1,436 bombers were on airborne alert, and some 145 intercontinental ballistic missiles stood on ready alert, some of which targeted Cuba. Air Defense Command (ADC) redeployed 161 nuclear-armed interceptors to 16 dispersal fields within nine hours, with one third maintaining 15-minute alert status. Twenty-three nuclear-armed B-52s were sent to orbit points within striking distance of the Soviet Union so it would believe that the US was serious. Jack J. Catton later estimated that about 80 per cent of SAC's planes were ready for launch during the crisis; David A. Burchinal recalled that, by contrast:

By October 22, Tactical Air Command (TAC) had 511 fighters, plus supporting tankers and reconnaissance aircraft, deployed to face Cuba on one-hour alert status. TAC and the Military Air Transport Service had problems. The concentration of aircraft in Florida strained command and support echelons, which faced critical undermanning in security, armaments, and communications; the absence of initial authorization for war-reserve stocks of conventional munitions forced TAC to scrounge; and the lack of airlift assets to support a major airborne drop necessitated the call-up of 24 reserve squadrons.

On October 25 at 1:45 am EDT, Kennedy responded to Khrushchev's telegram by stating that the US was forced into action after receiving repeated assurances that no offensive missiles were being placed in Cuba, and when the assurances proved to be false, the deployment "required the responses I have announced.... I hope that your government will take necessary action to permit a restoration of the earlier situation."

Blockade challenged
At 7:15 am EDT on October 25,  and  attempted to intercept Bucharest but failed to do so. Fairly certain that the tanker did not contain any military material, the US allowed it through the blockade. Later that day, at 5:43 pm, the commander of the blockade effort ordered the destroyer  to intercept and board the Lebanese freighter Marucla. That took place the next day, and Marucla was cleared through the blockade after its cargo was checked.

At 5:00 pm EDT on October 25, William Clements announced that the missiles in Cuba were still actively being worked on. That report was later verified by a CIA report that suggested there had been no slowdown at all. In response, Kennedy issued Security Action Memorandum 199, authorizing the loading of nuclear weapons onto aircraft under the command of SACEUR, which had the duty of carrying out first air strikes on the Soviet Union. Kennedy claimed that the blockade had succeeded when the USSR turned back fourteen ships presumably carrying offensive weapons. The first indication of this came from a report from the British GCHQ sent to the White House Situation Room containing intercepted communications from Soviet ships reporting their positions. On October 24, Kislovodsk, a Soviet cargo ship, reported a position north-east of where it had been 24 hours earlier indicating it had "discontinued" its voyage and turned back towards the Baltic. The next day, reports showed more ships originally bound for Cuba had altered their course.

Raising the stakes
The next morning, October 26, Kennedy informed the EXCOMM that he believed only an invasion would remove the missiles from Cuba. He was persuaded to give the matter time and continue with both military and diplomatic pressure. He agreed and ordered the low-level flights over the island to be increased from two per day to once every two hours. He also ordered a crash program to institute a new civil government in Cuba if an invasion went ahead.

At this point, the crisis was ostensibly at a stalemate. The Soviets had shown no indication that they would back down and had made public media and private inter-governmental statements to that effect. The US had no reason to believe otherwise and was in the early stages of preparing for an invasion, along with a nuclear strike on the Soviet Union if it responded militarily, which the US assumed it would. Kennedy had no intention of keeping these plans a secret; with an array of Cuban and Soviet spies forever present, Khrushchev was quickly made aware of this looming danger.

The implicit threat of air strikes on Cuba followed by invasion allowed the United States to exert pressure in future talks. It was the possibility of military action that played an influential role in accelerating Khrushchev's proposal for a compromise. Throughout the closing stages of October, Soviet communications to the United States indicated increasing defensiveness. Khrushchev's increasing tendency to use poorly phrased and ambiguous communications throughout the compromise negotiations conversely increased United States confidence and clarity in messaging. Leading Soviet figures consistently failed to mention that only the Cuban government could agree to inspections of the territory and continually made arrangements relating to Cuba without the knowledge of Fidel Castro himself. According to Dean Rusk, Khrushchev "blinked"; he began to panic from the consequences of his own plan, and this was reflected in the tone of Soviet messages. This allowed the US to largely dominate negotiations in late October.

Secret negotiations
At 1:00 pm EDT on October 26, John A. Scali of ABC News had lunch with Aleksandr Fomin, the cover name of Alexander Feklisov, the KGB station chief in Washington, at Fomin's request. Following the instructions of the Politburo of the CPSU, Fomin noted, "War seems about to break out." He asked Scali to use his contacts to talk to his "high-level friends" at the State Department to see if the US would be interested in a diplomatic solution. He suggested that the language of the deal would contain an assurance from the Soviet Union to remove the weapons under UN supervision and that Castro would publicly announce that he would not accept such weapons again in exchange for a public statement by the US that it would not invade Cuba. The US responded by asking the Brazilian government to pass a message to Castro that the US would be "unlikely to invade" if the missiles were removed.

At 6:00 pm EDT on October 26, the State Department started receiving a message that appeared to be written personally by Khrushchev. It was Saturday 2:00 am in Moscow. The long letter took several minutes to arrive, and it took translators additional time to translate and transcribe it.

Robert F. Kennedy described the letter as "very long and emotional". Khrushchev reiterated the basic outline that had been stated to Scali earlier in the day: "I propose: we, for our part, will declare that our ships bound for Cuba are not carrying any armaments. You will declare that the United States will not invade Cuba with its troops and will not support any other forces which might intend to invade Cuba. Then the necessity of the presence of our military specialists in Cuba will disappear." At 6:45 pm EDT, news of Fomin's offer to Scali was finally heard and was interpreted as a "set up" for the arrival of Khrushchev's letter. The letter was then considered official and accurate, although it was later learned that Fomin was almost certainly operating of his own accord without official backing. Additional study of the letter was ordered and continued into the night.

Crisis continues

Castro, on the other hand, was convinced that an invasion of Cuba was soon at hand, and on October 26, he sent a telegram to Khrushchev that appeared to call for a pre-emptive nuclear strike on the US in case of attack. In a 2010 interview, Castro expressed regret about his 1962 stance on first use: "After I've seen what I've seen, and knowing what I know now, it wasn't worth it at all." Castro also ordered all anti-aircraft weapons in Cuba to fire on any US aircraft; previous orders had been to fire only on groups of two or more. At 6:00 am EDT on October 27, the CIA delivered a memo reporting that three of the four missile sites at San Cristobal and both sites at Sagua la Grande appeared to be fully operational. It also noted that the Cuban military continued to organise for action but was under order not to initiate action unless attacked.

At 9:00 am EDT on October 27, Radio Moscow began broadcasting a message from Khrushchev. Contrary to the letter of the night before, the message offered a new trade: the missiles on Cuba would be removed in exchange for the removal of the Jupiter missiles from Italy and Turkey. At 10:00 am EDT, the executive committee met again to discuss the situation and came to the conclusion that the change in the message was because of internal debate between Khrushchev and other party officials in the Kremlin. Kennedy realised that he would be in an "insupportable position if this becomes Khrushchev's proposal" because the missiles in Turkey were not militarily useful and were being removed anyway and "It's gonna – to any man at the United Nations or any other rational man, it will look like a very fair trade." Bundy explained why Khrushchev's public acquiescence could not be considered: "The current threat to peace is not in Turkey, it is in Cuba."

McNamara noted that another tanker, the Grozny, was about  out and should be intercepted. He also noted that they had not made the Soviets aware of the blockade line and suggested relaying that information to them via U Thant at the United Nations.

While the meeting progressed, at 11:03 am EDT a new message began to arrive from Khrushchev. The message stated, in part:

"You are disturbed over Cuba. You say that this disturbs you because it is ninety-nine miles by sea from the coast of the United States of America. But... you have placed destructive missile weapons, which you call offensive, in Italy and Turkey, literally next to us.... I therefore make this proposal: We are willing to remove from Cuba the means which you regard as offensive.... Your representatives will make a declaration to the effect that the United States... will remove its analogous means from Turkey... and after that, persons entrusted by the United Nations Security Council could inspect on the spot the fulfillment of the pledges made."

The executive committee continued to meet through the day.

Throughout the crisis, Turkey had repeatedly stated that it would be upset if the Jupiter missiles were removed. Italy's Prime Minister Amintore Fanfani, who was also Foreign Minister ad interim, offered to allow withdrawal of the missiles deployed in Apulia as a bargaining chip. He gave the message to one of his most trusted friends, Ettore Bernabei, general manager of RAI-TV, to convey to Arthur M. Schlesinger Jr. Bernabei was in New York to attend an international conference on satellite TV broadcasting.

On the morning of October 27, a U-2F (the third CIA U-2A, modified for air-to-air refuelling) piloted by USAF Major Rudolf Anderson, departed its forward operating location at McCoy AFB, Florida. At approximately 12:00 pm EDT, the aircraft was struck by an SA-2 surface-to-air missile launched from Cuba. The aircraft crashed, and Anderson was killed. Stress in negotiations between the Soviets and the US intensified; only later was it assumed that the decision to fire the missile was made locally by an undetermined Soviet commander, acting on his own authority. Later that day, at about 3:41 pm EDT, several US Navy RF-8A Crusader aircraft, on low-level photo-reconnaissance missions, were fired upon.

On October 28, 1962, Khrushchev told his son Sergei that the shooting down of Anderson's U-2 was by the "Cuban military at the direction of Raul Castro".

At 4:00 pm EDT, Kennedy recalled members of EXCOMM to the White House and ordered that a message should immediately be sent to U Thant asking the Soviets to suspend work on the missiles while negotiations were carried out. During the meeting, General Maxwell Taylor delivered the news that the U-2 had been shot down. Kennedy had earlier claimed he would order an attack on such sites if fired upon, but he decided to not act unless another attack was made. Forty years later, McNamara said:

Ellsberg said that Robert Kennedy (RFK) told him in 1964 that after the U-2 was shot down and the pilot killed, he (RFK) told Soviet ambassador Dobrynin, "You have drawn first blood ... . [T]he president had decided against advice ... not to respond militarily to that attack, but he [Dobrynin] should know that if another plane was shot at, ... we would take out all the SAMs and antiaircraft ... . And that would almost surely be followed by an invasion."

Drafting response

Emissaries sent by both Kennedy and Khrushchev agreed to meet at the Yenching Palace Chinese restaurant in the Cleveland Park neighbourhood of Washington, DC, on Saturday evening, October 27. Kennedy suggested to take Khrushchev's offer to trade away the missiles. Unknown to most members of the EXCOMM, but with the support of his brother the president, Robert Kennedy had been meeting with the Soviet Ambassador Dobrynin in Washington to discover whether the intentions were genuine. The EXCOMM was generally against the proposal because it would undermine NATO's authority, and the Turkish government had repeatedly stated it was against any such trade.

As the meeting progressed, a new plan emerged, and Kennedy was slowly persuaded. The new plan called for him to ignore the latest message and instead to return to Khrushchev's earlier one. Kennedy was initially hesitant, feeling that Khrushchev would no longer accept the deal because a new one had been offered, but Llewellyn Thompson argued that it was still possible. White House Special Counsel and Adviser Ted Sorensen and Robert Kennedy left the meeting and returned 45 minutes later, with a draft letter to that effect. The President made several changes, had it typed, and sent it.

After the EXCOMM meeting, a smaller meeting continued in the Oval Office. The group argued that the letter should be underscored with an oral message to Dobrynin that stated that if the missiles were not withdrawn, military action would be used to remove them. Rusk added one proviso that no part of the language of the deal would mention Turkey, but there would be an understanding that the missiles would be removed "voluntarily" in the immediate aftermath. The president agreed, and the message was sent.

At Rusk's request, Fomin and Scali met again. Scali asked why the two letters from Khrushchev were so different, and Fomin claimed it was because of "poor communications". Scali replied that the claim was not credible and shouted that he thought it was a "stinking double cross". He went on to claim that an invasion was only hours away, and Fomin stated that a response to the US message was expected from Khrushchev shortly and urged Scali to tell the State Department that no treachery was intended. Scali said that he did not think anyone would believe him, but he agreed to deliver the message. The two went their separate ways, and Scali immediately typed out a memo for the EXCOMM.

Within the US establishment, it was well understood that ignoring the second offer and returning to the first put Khrushchev in a terrible position. Military preparations continued, and all active duty Air Force personnel were recalled to their bases for possible action. Robert Kennedy later recalled the mood: "We had not abandoned all hope, but what hope there was now rested with Khrushchev's revising his course within the next few hours. It was a hope, not an expectation. The expectation was military confrontation by Tuesday (October 30), and possibly tomorrow (October 29) ...."

At 8:05 pm EDT, the letter drafted earlier in the day was delivered. The message read, "As I read your letter, the key elements of your proposals—which seem generally acceptable as I understand them—are as follows: 1) You would agree to remove these weapons systems from Cuba under appropriate United Nations observation and supervision; and undertake, with suitable safe-guards, to halt the further introduction of such weapon systems into Cuba. 2) We, on our part, would agree—upon the establishment of adequate arrangements through the United Nations, to ensure the carrying out and continuation of these commitments (a) to remove promptly the quarantine measures now in effect and (b) to give assurances against the invasion of Cuba." The letter was also released directly to the press to ensure it could not be "delayed". With the letter delivered, a deal was on the table. As Robert Kennedy noted, there was little expectation it would be accepted. At 9:00 pm EDT, the EXCOMM met again to review the actions for the following day. Plans were drawn up for air strikes on the missile sites as well as other economic targets, notably petroleum storage. McNamara stated that they had to "have two things ready: a government for Cuba, because we're going to need one; and secondly, plans for how to respond to the Soviet Union in Europe, because sure as hell they're going to do something there".

At 12:12 am EDT, on October 27, the US informed its NATO allies that "the situation is growing shorter.... the United States may find it necessary within a very short time in its interest and that of its fellow nations in the Western Hemisphere to take whatever military action may be necessary." To add to the concern, at 6:00 am, the CIA reported that all missiles in Cuba were ready for action.

On October 27, Khrushchev also received a letter from Castro, what is now known as the Armageddon Letter (dated the day before), which was interpreted as urging the use of nuclear force in the event of an attack on Cuba: "I believe the imperialists' aggressiveness is extremely dangerous and if they actually carry out the brutal act of invading Cuba in violation of international law and morality, that would be the moment to eliminate such danger forever through an act of clear legitimate defense, however harsh and terrible the solution would be," Castro wrote.

Averted nuclear launch

Later that same day, what the White House later called "Black Saturday", the US Navy dropped a series of "signalling" depth charges (practice depth charges the size of hand grenades) on a Soviet submarine at the blockade line, unaware that it was armed with a nuclear-tipped torpedo with orders that allowed it to be used if the submarine was damaged by depth charges or surface fire. As the submarine was too deep to monitor any radio traffic, the captain of the B-59, Valentin Grigoryevich Savitsky, decided that a war might already have started and wanted to launch a nuclear torpedo. The decision to launch these normally only required agreement from the two commanding officers on board, the Captain and the Political Officer. However, the commander of the submarine Flotilla, Vasily Arkhipov, was aboard B-59 and so he also had to agree. Arkhipov objected and so the nuclear launch was narrowly averted.

On the same day a U-2 spy plane made an accidental, unauthorised ninety-minute overflight of the Soviet Union's far eastern coast. The Soviets responded by scrambling MiG fighters from Wrangel Island; in turn, the Americans launched F-102 fighters armed with nuclear air-to-air missiles over the Bering Sea.

Resolution
On Saturday, October 27, after much deliberation between the Soviet Union and Kennedy's cabinet, Kennedy secretly agreed to remove all missiles set in Turkey and possibly southern Italy, the former on the border of the Soviet Union, in exchange for Khrushchev removing all missiles in Cuba. There is some dispute as to whether removing the missiles from Italy was part of the secret agreement. Khrushchev wrote in his memoirs that it was, and when the crisis had ended McNamara gave the order to dismantle the missiles in both Italy and Turkey.

At this point, Khrushchev knew things the US did not. First, that the shooting down of the U-2 by a Soviet missile violated direct orders from Moscow, and Cuban anti-aircraft fire against other US reconnaissance aircraft also violated direct orders from Khrushchev to Castro. Second, the Soviets already had 162 nuclear warheads on Cuba that the US did not then believe were there. Third, the Soviets and Cubans on the island would almost certainly have responded to an invasion by using those nuclear weapons, even though Castro believed that every human in Cuba would likely die as a result. Khrushchev also knew but may not have considered the fact that he had submarines armed with nuclear weapons that the US Navy may not have known about.

Khrushchev knew he was losing control. President Kennedy had been told in early 1961 that a nuclear war would likely kill a third of humanity, with most or all of those deaths concentrated in the US, the USSR, Europe and China; Khrushchev may well have received similar reports from his military.

With this background, when Khrushchev heard Kennedy's threats relayed by Robert Kennedy to Soviet Ambassador Dobrynin, he immediately drafted his acceptance of Kennedy's latest terms from his dacha without involving the Politburo, as he had previously, and had them immediately broadcast over Radio Moscow, which he believed the US would hear. In that broadcast at 9:00 am EST, on October 28, Khrushchev stated that "the Soviet government, in addition to previously issued instructions on the cessation of further work at the building sites for the weapons, has issued a new order on the dismantling of the weapons which you describe as 'offensive' and their crating and return to the Soviet Union." At 10:00 am, October 28, Kennedy first learned of Khrushchev's solution to the crisis with the US removing the 15 Jupiters in Turkey and the Soviets would remove the rockets from Cuba. Khrushchev had made the offer in a public statement for the world to hear. Despite almost solid opposition from his senior advisers, Kennedy quickly embraced the Soviet offer. "This is a pretty good play of his," Kennedy said, according to a tape recording that he made secretly of the Cabinet Room meeting. Kennedy had deployed the Jupiters in March 1962, causing a stream of angry outbursts from Khrushchev. "Most people will think this is a rather even trade and we ought to take advantage of it," Kennedy said. Vice President Lyndon Johnson was the first to endorse the missile swap but others continued to oppose the offer. Finally, Kennedy ended the debate. "We can't very well invade Cuba with all its toil and blood," Kennedy said, "when we could have gotten them out by making a deal on the same missiles on Turkey. If that's part of the record, then you don't have a very good war."

Kennedy immediately responded to Khrushchev's letter, issuing a statement calling it "an important and constructive contribution to peace". He continued this with a formal letter:

Kennedy's planned statement would also contain suggestions he had received from his adviser Schlesinger Jr. in a "Memorandum for the President" describing the "Post Mortem on Cuba".

On October 28, Kennedy participated in telephone conversations with Eisenhower and fellow former US President Harry Truman. In these calls, Kennedy revealed that he thought the crisis would result in the two superpowers being "toe to toe" in Berlin by the end of the following month and expressed concern that the Soviet setback in Cuba would "make things tougher" there. He also informed his predecessors that he had rejected the public Soviet offer to withdraw from Cuba in exchange for the withdrawal of US missiles from Turkey.

The US continued the blockade; in the following days, aerial reconnaissance proved that the Soviets were making progress in removing the missile systems. The 42 missiles and their support equipment were loaded onto eight Soviet ships. On November 2, 1962, Kennedy addressed the US via radio and television broadcasts regarding the dismantlement process of the Soviet R-12 missile bases located in the Caribbean region. The ships left Cuba on November 5 to 9. The US made a final visual check as each of the ships passed the blockade line. Further diplomatic efforts were required to remove the Soviet Il-28 bombers, and they were loaded on three Soviet ships on December 5 and 6. Concurrent with the Soviet commitment on the Il-28s, the US government announced the end of the blockade from 6:45 pm EST on November 20, 1962.

At the time when the Kennedy administration thought that the Cuban Missile Crisis was resolved, nuclear tactical rockets stayed in Cuba since they were not part of the Kennedy-Khrushchev understandings and the Americans did not know about them. The Soviets changed their minds, fearing possible future Cuban militant steps, and on November 22, 1962, Deputy Premier of the Soviet Union Anastas Mikoyan told Castro that the rockets with the nuclear warheads were being removed as well.

In his negotiations with the Soviet Ambassador Anatoly Dobrynin, Robert Kennedy informally proposed that the Jupiter missiles in Turkey would be removed "within a short time after this crisis was over". Under an operation code-named Operation Pot Pie, the removal of the Jupiters from Italy and Turkey began on April 1, and was completed by April 24, 1963. The initial plans were to recycle the missiles for use in other programs, but NASA and the USAF were not interested in retaining the missile hardware. The missile bodies were destroyed on site, warheads, guidance packages, and launching equipment worth $14 million were returned to the United States.

The practical effect of the Kennedy-Khrushchev Pact was that the US would remove their rockets from Italy and Turkey and that the Soviets had no intention of resorting to nuclear war if they were out-gunned by the US. Because the withdrawal of the Jupiter missiles from NATO bases in Italy and Turkey was not made public at the time, Khrushchev appeared to have lost the conflict and become weakened. The perception was that Kennedy had won the contest between the superpowers and that Khrushchev had been humiliated. Both Kennedy and Khrushchev took every step to avoid full conflict despite pressures from their respective governments. Khrushchev held power for another two years.

Nuclear forces
By the time of the crisis in October 1962, the total number of nuclear weapons in the stockpiles of each country numbered approximately 26,400 for the United States and 3,300 for the Soviet Union. For the US, around 3,500 (with a combined yield of approximately 6,300 megatons) would have been used in attacking the Soviet Union. The Soviets had considerably less strategic firepower at their disposal: some 300–320 bombs and warheads, without submarine-based weapons in a position to threaten the US mainland and most of their intercontinental delivery systems based on bombers that would have difficulty penetrating North American air defence systems. However, they had already moved 158 warheads to Cuba; between 95 and 100 would have been ready for use if the US had invaded Cuba, most of which were short-ranged. The US had approximately 4,375 nuclear weapons deployed in Europe, most of which were tactical weapons such as nuclear artillery, with around 450 of them for ballistic missiles, cruise missiles, and aircraft; the Soviets had more than 550 similar weapons in Europe.

United States
 SAC
 ICBM: 182 (at peak alert); 121 Atlas D/E/F, 53 Titan 1, 8 Minuteman 1A
 Bombers: 1,595; 880 B-47, 639 B-52, 76 B-58 (1,479 bombers and 1,003 refuelling tankers available at peak alert)
 Atlantic Command
 112 UGM-27 Polaris in seven SSBNs (16 each); five submarines with Polaris A1 and two with A2
 Pacific Command
 4–8 Regulus cruise missiles
 16 Mace cruise missiles
 Three aircraft carriers with some 40 bombs each
 Land-based aircraft with some 50 bombs
 European Command
 IRBM: 105; 60 Thor (UK), 45 Jupiter (30 Italy, 15 Turkey)
 48–90 Mace cruise missiles
 Two US Sixth Fleet aircraft carriers with some 40 bombs each
 Land-based aircraft with some 50 bombs

Soviet Union
 Strategic (for use against North America):
 ICBM: 42; four SS-6/R-7A at Plesetsk with two in reserve at Baikonur, 36 SS-7/R-16 with 26 in silos and ten on open launch pads
 Bombers: 160 (readiness unknown); 100 Tu-95 Bear, 60 3M Bison B
 Regional (mostly targeting Europe, and others targeting US bases in east Asia):
 MRBM: 528 SS-4/R-12, 492 at soft launch sites and 36 at hard launch sites (approximately six to eight R-12s were operational in Cuba, capable of striking the US mainland at any moment until the crisis was resolved)
 IRBM: 28 SS-5/R-14
 Unknown number of Tu-16 Badger, Tu-22 Blinder, and MiG-21 aircraft tasked with nuclear strike missions

Aftermath

Cuban leadership
Cuba perceived the outcome as a betrayal by the Soviets, as decisions on how to resolve the crisis had been made exclusively by Kennedy and Khrushchev. Castro was especially upset that certain issues of interest to Cuba, such as the status of the US Naval Base in Guantánamo, were not addressed. That caused Cuban–Soviet relations to deteriorate for years to come.

Historian Arthur Schlesinger believed that when the missiles were withdrawn, Castro was more angry with Khrushchev than with Kennedy because Khrushchev had not consulted Castro before deciding to remove them. Although Castro was infuriated by Khrushchev, he planned on striking the US with the remaining missiles if an invasion of the island occurred.

A few weeks after the crisis, during an interview with the British communist newspaper the Daily Worker, Guevara was still fuming over the perceived Soviet betrayal and told correspondent Sam Russell that, if the missiles had been under Cuban control, they would have fired them off. While expounding on the incident later, Guevara reiterated that the cause of socialist liberation against global "imperialist aggression" would ultimately have been worth the possibility of "millions of atomic war victims". The missile crisis further convinced Guevara that the world's two superpowers (the United States and the Soviet Union) used Cuba as a pawn in their own global strategies. Afterward, he denounced the Soviets almost as frequently as he denounced the Americans.

Romanian leadership
During the crisis, Gheorghe Gheorghiu-Dej, general secretary of Romania's communist party, sent a letter to President Kennedy dissociating Romania from Soviet actions. This convinced the American administration of Bucharest's intentions of detaching itself from Moscow.

Soviet leadership
The enormity of how close the world came to thermonuclear war impelled Khrushchev to propose a far-reaching easing of tensions with the US. In a letter to President Kennedy dated October 30, 1962, Khrushchev outlined a range of bold initiatives to forestall the possibility of a further nuclear crisis, including proposing a non-aggression treaty between the North Atlantic Treaty Organization (NATO) and the Warsaw Pact or even disbanding these military blocs, a treaty to cease all nuclear weapons testing and even the elimination of all nuclear weapons, resolution of the hot-button issue of Germany by both East and West formally accepting the existence of West Germany and East Germany, and US recognition of the government of mainland China. The letter invited counter-proposals and further exploration of these and other issues through peaceful negotiations. Khrushchev invited Norman Cousins, the editor of a major US periodical and an anti-nuclear weapons activist, to serve as liaison with President Kennedy, and Cousins met with Khrushchev for four hours in December 1962.

Kennedy's response to Khrushchev's proposals was lukewarm but Kennedy expressed to Cousins that he felt constrained in exploring these issues due to pressure from hardliners in the US national security apparatus. The United States and the Soviet Union did shortly thereafter agree on a treaty banning atmospheric testing of nuclear weapons, known as the "Partial Nuclear Test Ban Treaty".

Further after the crisis, the US and the USSR created the Moscow–Washington hotline, a direct communications link between Moscow and Washington. The purpose was to have a way that the leaders of the two Cold War countries could communicate directly to solve such a crisis.

The compromise embarrassed Khrushchev and the Soviet Union because the withdrawal of US missiles from Italy and Turkey was a secret deal between Kennedy and Khrushchev. Khrushchev went to Kennedy as he thought that the crisis was getting out of hand, but the Soviets were seen as retreating from circumstances that they had started.

Khrushchev's fall from power two years later was in part because of the Soviet Politburo's embarrassment at both Khrushchev's eventual concessions to the US and this ineptitude in precipitating the crisis in the first place. According to Dobrynin, the top Soviet leadership took the Cuban outcome as "a blow to its prestige bordering on humiliation".

US leadership
The worldwide US Forces DEFCON 3 status was returned to DEFCON 4 on November 20, 1962. General Curtis LeMay told the President that the resolution of the crisis was the "greatest defeat in our history"; his was a minority position. He had pressed for an immediate invasion of Cuba as soon as the crisis began and still favored invading Cuba even after the Soviets had withdrawn their missiles. Twenty-five years later, LeMay still believed that "We could have gotten not only the missiles out of Cuba, we could have gotten the Communists out of Cuba at that time."

By 1962 President Kennedy faced four crisis situations: the failure of the Bay of Pigs Invasion that he had approved of, settlement negotiations between the pro-Western government of Laos and the Pathet Lao communist movement ("Kennedy sidestepped Laos, whose rugged terrain was no battleground for American soldiers."), the construction of the Berlin Wall, and the Cuban Missile Crisis. Kennedy believed that yet another failure to gain control and stop communist expansion would irreparably damage US credibility. He was determined to "draw a line in the sand" and prevent a communist victory in Vietnam. He told James Reston of The New York Times immediately after his Vienna summit meeting with Khrushchev, "Now we have a problem making our power credible and Vietnam looks like the place."

At least four contingency strikes were armed and launched from Florida against Cuban airfields and suspected missile sites in 1963 and 1964, although all were diverted to the Pinecastle Range Complex after the planes passed Andros island. Critics, including Seymour Melman and Seymour Hersh, suggested that the Cuban Missile Crisis encouraged the United States' use of military means, such as the case in the later Vietnam War.

Human casualties
U-2 pilot Anderson's body was returned to the US and was buried with full military honours in South Carolina. He was the first recipient of the newly created Air Force Cross, which was awarded posthumously. Although Anderson was the only combatant fatality during the crisis, 11 crew members of three reconnaissance Boeing RB-47 Stratojets of the 55th Strategic Reconnaissance Wing were also killed in crashes during the period between September 27 and November 11, 1962. Seven crew died when a Military Air Transport Service Boeing C-135B Stratolifter delivering ammunition to Guantanamo Bay Naval Base stalled and crashed on approach on October 23.

Later revelations

Submarine close call
Arguably, the most dangerous moment in the crisis was not recognized until the Cuban Missile Crisis Havana conference, in October 2002. Unknown to the US, it was armed with a 15-kiloton nuclear torpedo. Running out of air, the Soviet submarine was surrounded by American warships and desperately needed to surface. An argument broke out among three officers aboard B-59, including submarine captain Valentin Savitsky, political officer Ivan Semyonovich Maslennikov, and Deputy brigade commander Captain 2nd rank (US Navy Commander rank equivalent) Vasily Arkhipov. An exhausted Savitsky became furious and ordered that the nuclear torpedo on board be made combat ready. Accounts differ about whether Arkhipov convinced Savitsky not to make the attack or whether Savitsky himself finally concluded that the only reasonable choice left open to him was to come to the surface. During the conference, McNamara stated that nuclear war had come much closer than people had thought. Thomas Blanton, director of the National Security Archive, said, "A guy called Vasily Arkhipov saved the world."

Possibility of nuclear launch
In early 1992, it was confirmed that Soviet forces in Cuba had already received tactical nuclear warheads for their artillery rockets and Il-28 bombers when the crisis broke. Castro stated that he would have recommended their use if the US invaded despite Cuba being destroyed.

Fifty years after the crisis, Graham Allison wrote:

BBC journalist Joe Matthews published the story, on October 13, 2012, behind the 100 tactical nuclear warheads mentioned by Graham Allison in the excerpt above. Khrushchev feared that Castro's hurt pride and widespread Cuban indignation over the concessions he had made to Kennedy might lead to a breakdown of the agreement between the Soviet Union and the United States. To prevent that, Khrushchev decided to offer to give Cuba more than 100 tactical nuclear weapons that had been shipped to Cuba along with the long-range missiles but, crucially, had escaped the notice of US intelligence. Khrushchev determined that because the Americans had not listed the missiles on their list of demands, keeping them in Cuba would be in the Soviet Union's interests.

Anastas Mikoyan was tasked with the negotiations with Castro over the missile transfer deal that was designed to prevent a breakdown in the relations between Cuba and the Soviet Union. While in Havana, Mikoyan witnessed the mood swings and paranoia of Castro, who was convinced that Moscow had made the agreement with the US at the expense of Cuba's defence. Mikoyan, on his own initiative, decided that Castro and his military should not be given control of weapons with an explosive force equal to 100 Hiroshima-sized bombs under any circumstances. He defused the seemingly intractable situation, which risked re-escalating the crisis, on November 22, 1962. During a tense, four-hour meeting, Mikoyan convinced Castro that despite Moscow's desire to help, it would be in breach of an unpublished Soviet law, which did not actually exist, to transfer the missiles permanently into Cuban hands and provide them with an independent nuclear deterrent. Castro was forced to give way and, much to the relief of Khrushchev and the rest of the Soviet government, the tactical nuclear weapons were crated and returned by sea to the Soviet Union during December 1962.

In popular culture 

The American popular media, especially television, made frequent use of the events of the missile crisis in both fictional and documentary forms. Jim Willis includes the Crisis as one of the 100 "media moments that changed America". Sheldon Stern finds that a half century later there are still many "misconceptions, half-truths, and outright lies" that have shaped media versions of what happened in the White House during those harrowing two weeks.

Historian William Cohn argued in a 1976 article that television programs are typically the main source used by the American public to know about and interpret the past. According to Cold War historian Andrei Kozovoi, the Soviet media proved somewhat disorganized as it was unable to generate a coherent popular history. Khrushchev lost power and was airbrushed out of the story. Cuba was no longer portrayed as a heroic David against the American Goliath. One contradiction that pervaded the Soviet media campaign was between the pacifistic rhetoric of the peace movement that emphasizes the horrors of nuclear war and the militancy of the need to prepare Soviets for war against American aggression.

Media representations

Non fiction 
 Thirteen Days, Robert F. Kennedy's memoir of the crisis, posthumously released in 1969; It became the basis for numerous films and documentaries.
 The Missiles of October, 1974 TV docudrama about the crisis.
 The Fog of War, 2003 American documentary film about the life and times of former US Secretary of Defense Robert S. McNamara directed by Errol Morris, which won that year's Academy Award for Best Documentary Feature."

Fiction 
 Topaz, 1969 film by Alfred Hitchcock based on the 1967 novel by Leon Uris, set during the run-up to the crisis.
 Matinee, 1993 film starring John Goodman set during the Cuban Missile Crisis in which an independent-filmmaker decides to seize the opportunity to debut an atomic themed film.
 Thirteen Days (film), based on The Kennedy Tapes: Inside the White House During the Cuban Missile Crisis, a 2000 docudrama directed by Roger Donaldson about the crisis.
 Command & Conquer: Red Alert 3, a 2008 video game, set in an alternate timeline where Einstein did not exist. During the Allied Nations campaign, an alternate version of the Cuban Missile Crisis occurs, dubbed in game as the mission "The Great Bear Trap", where the Soviet Union had secretly planned and constructed an invasion force in Havana, capped by specially designed Kirov Airships that were yielding 50 megaton bombs and intended to fly towards Allied controlled cities.
 Mad Men, the 2008 episode "Meditations in an Emergency" is set in the midst of the Cuban Missile Crisis.
 Ur, a 2009 short novel by Stephen King, is about three men who discover through a magic Kindle that in a parallel universe, the Cuban Missile Crisis escalated into a nuclear war and ended that universe.
 Call of Duty: Black Ops, 2010 video game, set during and after the Cuban Missile Crisis.
 The Kennedys (TV miniseries), 2011 production chronicling the lives of the Kennedy family, including a dramatisation of the crisis.
 X-Men: First Class, 2011 superhero film set during the Cuban Missile Crisis, which depicts the crisis as being escalated by a group of mutants with the goal of establishing a mutant ruling class after the subsequent war.
 The Courier (2020 film), tells the "true story of the British businessman Greville Wynne (played by Benedict Cumberbatch) who helped MI6 penetrate the Soviet nuclear programme during the Cold War. Wynne and his Russian source, Oleg Penkovsky (codenamed Ironbark), provided crucial intelligence that ended the Cuban Missile Crisis."

See also

 Bomber gap
 Cuban thaw
 Leninsky Komsomol class cargo ships
 List of nuclear close calls
 Norwegian rocket incident
 Nuclear disarmament
 Nuclear threats during the 2022 Russian invasion of Ukraine
 Peaceful coexistence
 Soviet Navy

Notes

References

Further reading
 
 Barrett, David M. and Max Holland (2012). Blind Over Cuba: The Photo Gap and the Missile Crisis. College Station, TX: Texas A&M University Press, 2012.
 Campus, Leonardo (2014). I sei giorni che sconvolsero il mondo. La crisi dei missili di Cuba e le sue percezioni internazionali [=Six Days that Shook the World. The Cuban Missile Crisis and Its International Perceptions]. Florence: Le Monnier. 
 
 Cockburn, Andrew, "Defensive, Not Aggressive" (review of Theodore Voorhees, The Silent Guns of Two Octobers: Kennedy and Khrushchev Play the Double Game, Michigan, September 2021, 384 pp.; and Serhii Plokhy, Nuclear Folly: A New History of the Cuban Missile Crisis, Allen Lane, April 2021, 464 pp.), London Review of Books, vol. 43, no. 17 (9 September 2021), pp. 9–10. "[F]or Kennedy, the [Cuban Missile] crisis was entirely about [internal US] politics." [...] Voorhees argues convincingly that there was never any real danger of war, since Kennedy and Khrushchev were equally determined to avoid one..." (p. 10.)
 
 
 
 
 
 
 
 
 
 
 
 
 Kolbert, Elizabeth, "This Close: The day the Cuban missile crisis almost went nuclear" (a review of Martin J. Sherwin's Gambling with Armageddon: Nuclear Roulette from Hiroshima to the Cuban Missile Crisis, New York, Knopf, 2020), The New Yorker, 12 October 2020, pp. 70–73. Article includes information from recently declassified sources.
 Plokhy, Serhii. Nuclear Folly: A History of the Cuban Missile Crisis (W. W. Norton & Company, 2021).
 
 
 Powers, Thomas, "The Nuclear Worrier" (review of Daniel Ellsberg, The Doomsday Machine: Confessions of a Nuclear War Planner, New York, Bloomsbury, 2017, 420 pp.), The New York Review of Books, vol. LXV, no. 1 (January 18, 2018), pp. 13–15.
 
 
 Seydi, SÜleyman. “Turkish—American Relations and the Cuban Missile Crisis, 1957-63.” Middle Eastern Studies 46#3 (2010), pp. 433–455. online
 
 
 
 
 
 Weaver, Michael E. The Relationship between Diplomacy and Military Force: An Example from the Cuban Missile Crisis, Diplomatic History, January 2014, Volume 38, Number 1, pp. 137–81. The Relationship between Diplomacy and Military Force: An Example from the Cuban Missile Crisis
 White, Mark. "The Other Missiles of October: Eisenhower, Kennedy, and the Jupiters, 1957-1963." Diplomatic History (2002) 26#1 pp 147–153.

Historiography

Primary sources
  Getchell, Michelle. Cuban Missile Crisis and the Cold War: A Short History with Documents(Hackett Publishing, 2018) 200 pp. online review
 
 
 
 
 
 
 
 
 
 
 
 
 Dallek, Robert. "If We Listen to Them, None of Us Will Be Alive." In Camelot's Court, 279–334. New York: HarperCollins, 2013.

Lesson plans

External links

 "Cuban Missile Crisis", 2012, Harvard Kennedy School, Belfer Center's 50th anniversary of the crisis – commemorative website
 
 Cuban Missile Crisis and the Fallout from the Dean Peter Krogh Foreign Affairs Digital Archives
 
 
 
 Cuban Missile Crisis, 1962
 October 1962: DEFCON 4, DEFCON 3
 Spartacus Educational(UK): Cuban Missile Crisis
 Document – Britain's Cuban Missile Crisis
 No Time to Talk: The Cuban Missile Crisis
 Patrick J. Kiger (June 7, 2019): Key Moments in the Cuban Missile Crisis. A Timeline of the Cuban Missile Crisis with the links to the correspondence between John F. Kennedy and Nikita Khrushchev during the crisis. In: History.com. Archived from the original on March 29, 2022. Retrieved March 29, 2022
 The 32nd Guards Air Fighter Regiment in Cuba (1962–1963) S.Isaev.
 
 The Woodrow Wilson Center's Digital Archive has a collection of primary source archival documents on the Cuban Missile Crisis.
 EDSITEment lesson plan Cuban Missile Crisis
 EDSITEment Cuban Missile Crisis Interactive
 Cuban Missile Crisis: Three Men Go To War Documentary produced by PBS
 The Armageddon Letters, a transmedia storytelling of the crisis with animated short films and other digital content
 The Man Who Saved the World Documentary produced by PBS Series Secrets of the Dead
 

 
Aftermath of the Cuban Revolution
Cold War conflicts
Conflicts in 1962
1962 in international relations
Cold War history of Cuba
Cold War history of the Soviet Union
Cold War history of the United States
1962 in Cuba
1962 in the Soviet Union
1962 in the United States
Blockades
Cold War military history of Cuba
History of Cuba
History of Key West, Florida
Nuclear history of the Soviet Union
Nuclear history of the United States
Fidel Castro
Nikita Khrushchev
Presidency of John F. Kennedy
Cuba–Soviet Union relations
Cuba–United States relations
Soviet Union–United States relations
1962 establishments in Cuba
1962 disestablishments in Cuba
1960s in Cuba
1960s in the Soviet Union
1960s in the United States
October 1962 events in North America
United States involvement in regime change